District 9 of the Texas Senate is a senatorial district that currently serves portions of Dallas and Tarrant counties in the U.S. state of Texas. The current Senator from District 9 is Kelly Hancock.

Election history
Election history of District 9 from 1992.

Most recent election

2018

Previous elections

2014

2012

2008

2004

2002

2000

1996

1994

1992

District officeholders

References

09
Dallas County, Texas
Tarrant County, Texas